Vyšný Mirošov is a village and municipality in Svidník District in the Prešov Region of north-eastern Slovakia.

History
In historical records the village was first mentioned in 1567.

Geography
The municipality lies at an altitude of 344 metres and covers an area of 12.708 km². It has a population of about 584 people.

References

External links
 
 

Villages and municipalities in Svidník District
Šariš